Several ships have been named Oracabessa (or Aracabessa, or Orakabeza, or Oracabezza, or Orracabeza) for Oracabessa, a small town in St Mary, Jamaica.

  (or Aracabessa in some United States sources), was a West Indiaman launched at Hull. A French privateer captured and burnt Orakabeza within the bar of Charleston Harbor, in violation of the United States's neutrality.
  was launched at Hull. In May 1823 she foundered on the Long Sand in a hurricane in the Bay of Bengal while on the way to Mauritius.
 Oracabessa was reported on 17 March 1835 to have wrecked at Hope Bay, Jamaica.
 Oracabessa was launched in 1894 as Carlisle City by Wm Doxford, Sunderland, for Furness Withy & Co. Fyffes Line purchased her in 1902 to use as a banana boat. She was of 3,002 tons (GRT). After a sequence of owners and some changes of name she was scrapped in 1932.

Citations

Ship names
Maritime incidents in May 1823
Maritime incidents in March 1835